"Song of Liberty" is a British patriotic song which became popular during the Second World War.

The song was set to the music of Edward Elgar's Pomp and Circumstance March No. 4. It followed the success of Land of Hope and Glory, another patriotic song with lyrics by A. C. Benson set to Elgar's Pomp and Circumstance March No. 1.  In 1940, six years after the death of the composer, A. P. Herbert (with permission) wrote lyrics to the tune.

It is not known who arranged the music for the song: they would have been known to the publisher at the time, but their name is not acknowledged on the publication.

Lyrics
Herbert wrote two verses for the song, each followed by a refrain:
"All men must be free March for liberty with me. Brutes and braggarts may ...have their little sway We shall never bend the knee ..." from which the song gets its title.

In Popular Culture

The song appeared in the Stanley Kubrick's 1972 movie, A Clockwork Orange. In the film, Alex, the main character, had just accepted to participate in a British government program that promised to cease his appel for violence.

The program's goal is achieved by the use of torture, making Alex unable of doing the violence acts he was used, because those acts reminded him of the pain he saw in the program.

The song, therefore, appears in the movie in a ironic way, while the main character is on his way to a Pavlov training.

References

1940 songs
British patriotic songs
Songs by Edward Elgar
Works by A. P. Herbert
Songs about freedom